The population of Indonesia was 270.20 million according to the 2020 national census, an increase from 237.64 in 2010. Indonesia is the fourth most populous country in the world. Approximately 55% of Indonesia's population resides on Java, which is the most populous island in the world.

Despite a fairly effective family planning program that has been in place since 1967, Indonesia's average population growth per year was over 1.1% for the decade ending in 2020, nearly having 13% population growth for that decade. At this rate, Indonesia's population is projected to surpass the population of the United States if the population growth is not maintained.

Indonesia has a relatively young population compared to Western nations, though it is aging as the country's birth rate has slowed and its life expectancy has increased. The median age was 30.2 years in 2017.
Indonesia includes numerous ethnic, cultural and linguistic groups, some of which are related to each other. Since independence, Indonesian is the language of most written communication, education, government, and business. Many local ethnic languages are the first language of most Indonesians and are still important.

Population

Population by province

Source: Population Census 2010, except for final column, taken from Inter-Census Survey 2015.

Note: (a) North Kalimantan province was created in 2012 (by separation from East Kalimantan province); the 2010 total figures given are those for the provinces as they were following that splitting (Urban % and Total Fertility Rate columns unadjusted).

Age structure

Population Estimates by Sex and Age Group (01.VII.2020):

Vital statistics

United Nations estimates

Source: UN DESA, World Population Prospects, 2022

Registered births and deaths

Data from Department of Statistics of Indonesia :

Fertility and Births (Demographic and Health Surveys)
Total Fertility Rate (TFR) (Wanted Fertility Rate) and Crude Birth Rate (CBR):

According to the CIA World Factbook, in 2020 Indonesia's average total fertility rate was 2.04 children/born per woman.

Fertility rate and aging population (by province)
Total fertility rate (TFR) and population over age 60 by region as of 2010:

Ethnic groups

There are over 1,300 ethnic groups in Indonesia; 95% of those are of Native Indonesian ancestry. Javanese is the largest group with 100 million people (42%), followed by Sundanese, who number nearly 40 million (15%).

Religions

Indonesia is the world's most populous Muslim-majority nation; 86.7% of Indonesians declared themselves Muslim in the 2018 census. 10.72% of the population adhered to Christianity (of which more than 70% were Protestant), 1.74% were Hindu, 0.77% Buddhist, and 0.07% of other faiths. Most Indonesian Hindus are Balinese and most Buddhists in modern-day Indonesia are Chinese.

Languages

Indonesian is the official language, but there are many different languages native to Indonesia. According to Ethnologue, there are currently 737 living languages spoken in Indonesia, the most widely spoken being Javanese and Sundanese. In Western New Guinea, there are more than 270 indigenous languages in spoken form. Some Chinese varieties, most prominently Min Nan, are also spoken. The public use of Chinese, especially usage of Chinese characters, was dissuaded officially between 1966 and 1998.

Literacy
definition: age 15 and over can read and write
total population: 92.81%
male: 95.5%
female: 90.4% (2011 est.)

Education is free in state schools; it is compulsory for children through to grade 12. Although about 92% of eligible children are enrolled in primary school, a much smaller percentage attend full-time. About 44% of secondary school-age children attend junior high school, and some others of this age group attend vocational schools.

CIA World Factbook demographic statistics

The following demographic statistics are from the CIA World Factbook, unless otherwise indicated.

Age structure

0-14 years: 23.33% 
15-64 years: 70.72% 
65 years and over: 5.95% (2020 census)

Median age
total: 31.1 years
male: 30.5 years
female: 31.8 years (2020 est.)

Birth rate

15.32 births/1,000 population (2022 est.)

Death rate

6.75 deaths/1,000 population (2022 est.)

Population growth rate

1.097% (2010 est.)
1.04% (2012 est.)
0.86% (2017 est.)
0.79% (2022 est.)

Urbanization
urban population: 57.9% of total population (2022)
rate of urbanisation: 1.99% annual rate of change (2020-25 est.)

Sex ratio
at birth: 1.05 male(s)/female
0-14 years: 1.05 male(s)/female
15-24 years: 1.05 male(s)/female
25-54 years: 0.99 male(s)/female
55-64 years: 0.98 male(s)/female
65 years and over: 0.66 male(s)/female
total population: 1 male(s)/female (2022 est.)

Infant mortality rate

total: 19.73 deaths/1,000 live births
male: 22.15 deaths/1,000 live births
female: 17.18 deaths/1,000 live births (2022 est.)

Life expectancy at birth

total population: 73.08 years 
male: 70.86 years 
female: 75.4 years (2022 est.)

Total fertility rate

2.01 children born/woman (2022 est.)

HIV/AIDS
 Adult prevalence rate: 0.4% (2017 est.)
 People living with HIV/AIDS: 630,000 (2017 est.)
 HIV/AIDS deaths: 39,000 (2017 est.)

Obesity – adult prevalence rate

 6.9% (2016)

Children under the age of 5 years underweight

 19.9% (2013)

Nationality

noun: Indonesian(s)
adjective: Indonesian
Ethnic groups: Javanese 40.1%, Sundanese 15.5%, Malay 3.7%, Batak 3.6%, Madurese 3%, Betawi 2.9%, Minangkabau 2.7%, Buginese 2.7%, Bantenese 2%, Banjarese 1.7%, Balinese 1.7%, Acehnese 1.4%, Dayak 1.4%, Sasak 1.3%, Chinese 1.2%, other 15% (2010 est.)

Religions
Muslim 86.7%, Christianity 10.72% (Protestant 7.6% and Roman Catholic 3.12%), Hinduism 1.74%, other 0.8% (includes Buddhist and Confucian), unspecified 0.04% (2018 est.)

Languages
Indonesian (official, a form of Malay influenced by other languages of Indonesia), local languages (the most widely spoken of which is Javanese).

School life expectancy (primary to tertiary education)
total: 11 years
male: 12 years
female: 11 years (2005)

Education expenditures
2.8% of GDP (2014)

See also

 Census in Indonesia
 Culture of Indonesia
 Native Indonesians
 Overseas Indonesian
 Transmigration program

References

External links
 Indonesian Central Bureau of Statistics 
 CIA World Factbook article on Indonesia
 On Indonesians of Arab descent
 United Nations "World Population Prospects": Country Profile – Indonesia